Theodor Piderit (15 September 1826 in Detmold — 24 January 1912 in Detmold) was a German writer.

External links
 

19th-century German writers
20th-century German writers
1826 births
1912 deaths
People from Detmold
19th-century German male writers
20th-century German male writers